Thomas Lindsay Buick  (13 May 1865 – 22 February 1938) was a Liberal Member of Parliament for Wairau, New Zealand, a journalist and a historian. He published under the name T. Lindsay Buick.

Early life
Born in Oamaru on 13 May 1865, Buick was the son of Margaret (née Petrie) and John Walter Buick. His parents had emigrated from England to Port Chalmers in 1860. Buick received his education at schools in Oamaru and moved to Blenheim in 1884 to work as a carpenter. Although he had no relation to Ireland or Catholicism, he joined the Irish National League "purely as a lover of liberty and justice", and in 1889 he embarked on a speaker tour. He was also active in the temperance movement.

Buick married Mary Fitzgerald on 8 January 1891 at Blenheim; they were to have no children.

Member of Parliament

Buick represented the Wairau electorate in the New Zealand House of Representatives from 1890 to 1896, when he was defeated.  The 1896 general election was contested by Buick and Charles H. Mills, who received 2014 and 2072 votes, respectively. Mills thus succeeded Buick. He was a temperance advocate and supporter of Irish Home Rule.

From 1893 until 1894 he was the Liberal Party's junior whip.

Years later, in July 1904 he unsuccessfully contested Pahiatua by-election as the official Liberal candidate.

Historical work
Buick wrote numerous works on the pre-European and early contact history New Zealand, and two books on music. His The Treaty of Waitangi: or, How New Zealand became a British Colony (1916) remained the only substantial work on the Treaty until the late 1980s.

Later, he was owner/publisher of the Dannevirke Advocate.

Honours and awards
In the 1933 King's Birthday Honours, Buick was appointed a Companion of the Order of St Michael and St George (CMG), for public services. In 1935, he was awarded the King George V Silver Jubilee Medal.

Published work
 
 Old Manawatu: or, The Wild Days of the West (1903)
 Old New Zealander: or, Te Rauparaha, the Napoleon of the South (1911)
 Letters from Abroad (1914)
 The Treaty of Waitangi: or, How New Zealand became a British Colony (1916)
 New Zealand's First War: or, The Rebellion of Hone Heke (1926)
 Romance of the Gramophone (1927)
 French at Akaroa: An Adventure in Colonization (1928)
 Jubilee of the Port of Wellington, 1880-1930 (1930)
 Mystery of the Moa: New Zealand's Avian Giant (1931)
 British Residency at Waitangi (1932)
 Waitangi: Ninety-four Years After (1934)
 Old British Residency at the Bay of Islands (1934)
 Centenary of a Flag: New Zealand's Old National Ensign (1934)
 Elijah: The Story of Mendelssohn’s Oratorio (1935)
 The Discovery of Dinornis: The Story of a Man, a Bone, and a Bird (1936)
 Moa-Hunters of New Zealand: Sportsmen of the Stone Age (1936)

Notes

References

External links
 
 

1865 births
1938 deaths
People from Oamaru
Members of the New Zealand House of Representatives
20th-century New Zealand historians
New Zealand Liberal Party MPs
New Zealand MPs for South Island electorates
New Zealand Companions of the Order of St Michael and St George
19th-century New Zealand politicians
19th-century New Zealand journalists
20th-century New Zealand journalists
Unsuccessful candidates in the 1896 New Zealand general election